(August 826 – 7 October 858) was the 55th emperor of Japan, according to the traditional order of succession.

Montoku's reign lasted from 850 to 858.

Traditional narrative
He was also known as Tamura-no-mikado or Tamura-tei.

He was the eldest son of Emperor Ninmyō.  His mother was Empress Dowager Fujiwara no Junshi (also called the Gojō empress 五条后), daughter of the minister of the left, Fujiwara no Fuyutsugu.

Montoku had six Imperial consorts and 29 Imperial children.

Events of Montoku's life
 6 May 850 (Kashō 3, 21st day of the 3rd month):  In the 17th year of Ninmyō-tennōs reign (仁明天皇十七年), the emperor died; and his eldest son received the succession (senso).
 850 (Kashō 3, 4th month): Emperor Montoku formally acceded to the throne (sokui).
 850 (Kashō 3, 5th month): The widow of Emperor Saga, who was also the mother of Emperor Ninmyō and the grandmother of Emperor Montoku, died.
 850 (Kashō 3, 11th month): The emperor named Korehito-shinnō, the 4th son of Emperor Montoku as his heir.  This 9-month-old baby was also the grandson of  udaijin Fujiwara no Yoshifusa.
 853 (Ninju 3,  2nd month): The emperor visited the home of udaijin Yoshifusa, the grandfather of his designated heir.
 11 July 854 (Saikō 1, 13th day of the 6th month): The sadaijin Minamoto no Tokiwa, also known as Minamoto no Tsune, died at age 43.
 855 (Saikō 2, in the 1st month): The Emishi organized a rebellion; and in response, a force of 1,000 men and provisions were sent to the north.
 855 (Saikō 2, 5th month): The head of the great statute of Buddha in the Tōdai-ji fell off; and in consequence, the emperor ordered the then dainagon Fujiwara no Yoshisuke, the brother of sadaijin Yoshifusa, to be in charge of gathering the gifts of the pious from throughout the empire to make another head for the Daibutsu.

Events during his reign included the repression of insurrections among the Ebisu people in Mutsu Province in 855, and among the people of the island of Tsushima two years later.

 7 October 858 (Ten'an 2, 27th day of the 8th month): Montoku died at the age of 32.

The actual site of Montoku's grave is known.  This emperor is traditionally venerated at a memorial Shinto shrine (misasagi) at Kyoto.

The Imperial Household Agency designates this location as Montoku's mausoleum.  It is formally named Tamura no misasagi.

Kugyō
 is a collective term for the very few most powerful men attached to the court of the Emperor of Japan in pre-Meiji eras.– kugyō of Montoku-tennō (in French)

In general, this elite group included only three to four men at a time.  These were hereditary courtiers whose experience and background would have brought them to the pinnacle of a life's career.  During Montoku's reign, this apex of the Daijō-kan included:
 Daijō-daijin, Fujiwara no Yoshifusa　(藤原良房), 804–872.
 Sadaijin, Minamoto no Tokiwa　(源常), 812–854.
 Sadaijin, Minamoto no Makoto　(源信), 810–868.
 Udaijin, Fujiwara no Yoshifusa　(藤原良房), 804–872.
 Udaijin, Fujiwara no Yoshimi　(藤原良相), 813–867.
 Naidaijin (not appointed)
 Dainagon

Eras of Montoku's reign
The years of Montoku's reign are more specifically identified by more than one era name or nengō.
 Kashō   (848–851)
 Ninju  (851–854)
 Saikō  (854–857)

Consorts and children
Consort (Nyōgo) (Tai-Kotaigō): Fujiwara no Akirakeiko (藤原明子; 829–899), also known as Somedono-no-Kisaki, Fujiwara no Yoshifusa’s daughter.
Fourth Son: Imperial Prince Korehito (惟仁親王) later Emperor Seiwa
Third Daughter: Imperial Princess Gishi (儀子内親王; d. 879), 6th Saiin in Kamo Shrine 859–876

Consort (Nyōgo): Fujiwara no Koshi/Furuko (藤原古子), Fujiwara no Fuyutsugu's daughter

Consort (Nyōgo): Fujiwara no Takakiko (藤原多賀幾子; d. 858), Fujiwara no Yoshimi's daughter

Consort (Nyōgo): Princess Azumako (東子女王; d. 865)

Consort (Nyōgo): Fujiwara no Nenshi/Toshiko (藤原年子)

Consort (Nyōgo): Fujiwara no Koreko (藤原是子)

Consort (Nyōgo): Tachibana no Fusako (橘房子), Tachibana no Ujikimi's daughter

Consort (Nyōgo): Tachibana no Chushi (橘忠子), Tachibana no Ujikimi's daughter

Consort (Koui): Ki no Shizuko (紀静子; d. 866), Ki no Natora's daughter
First Son: Imperial Prince Koretaka (惟喬親王; 844–897)
Second son: Imperial Prince Koreeda (惟条親王; 848–868)
Imperial Princess Tenshi (恬子内親王; d. 913), 20th Saiō in Ise Shrine 859–876
Fifth daughter: Imperial Princess Jutsushi (述子内親王; d. 897), 5th Saiin in Kamo Shrine 857–858
Imperial Princess Chinshi (珍子内親王; d. 877)

Court lady: Shigeno no Okuko (滋野奥子), Shigeno no Sadanushi's daughter
Third Son: Imperial Prince Korehiko (惟彦親王; 850–883)
Imperial Princess Nōshi (濃子内親王; d. 903)
Imperial Princess Shōshi (勝子内親王; d. 871)

Court lady: Fujiwara no Konshi/Imako (藤原今子), Fujiwara no Sadamori's daughter
Imperial Prince Koretsune (惟恒親王; d. 904)
Imperial Princess Reishi (礼子内親王; d. 899)
Seventh Daughter: Imperial Princess Keishi (掲子内親王; d. 914), 22nd Saiō in Ise Shrine 882–884

Court lady: Fujiwara no Retsushi (藤原列子), Fujiwara no Koreo's daughter
First Daughter: Imperial Princess Anshi (晏子内親王; d. 900), 19th Saiō in Ise Shrine 850–858
Eighth Daughter: Imperial Princess Akirakeiko (慧子内親王; d. 881), 4th Saiin in Kamo Shrine 850–857

Court lady: Shigeno no Mineko (滋野岑子), Shigeno no Sadao's daughter
Minamoto no Motoari (源本有)
Minamoto no Noriari (源載有)
Minamoto no Fuchiko/Shigeko (源淵子/滋子; d. 911)

Court lady: Tomo clan's daughter
Minamoto no Yoshiari (源能有; 845–897), Udaijin 896–897

Court lady: Fuse clan's daughter
Minamoto no Yukiari (源行有; 854–887)

Court lady: Tajihi clan's daughter
Minamoto no Tsuneari (源毎有)

Court lady: Kiyohara clan's daughter
Minamoto no Tokiari (源時有)

Court lady: Sugawara clan's daughter
Minamoto no Sadaari (源定有)
Minamoto no Tomiko (源富子)

(from unknown women)
Minamoto no Tomiari (源富有, d.887)
Minamoto no Hyōshi (源憑子)
Minamoto no Kenshi (源謙子)
Minamoto no Okuko (源奥子)
Minamoto no Retsushi (源列子)
Minamoto no Seishi (源済子), married to Emperor Seiwa
Minamoto no Shuko (源修子)

Ancestry

See also
 Emperor of Japan
 List of Emperors of Japan
 Imperial cult
 Nihon Montoku Tennō Jitsuroku, one of the Six National Histories

Notes

References
 Brown, Delmer M. and Ichirō Ishida, eds. (1979).  Gukanshō: The Future and the Past. Berkeley: University of California Press. ;  
 Ponsonby-Fane, Richard Arthur Brabazon. (1959).  The Imperial House of Japan. Kyoto: Ponsonby Memorial Society. 
 Titsingh, Isaac. (1834). Nihon Ōdai Ichiran; ou,  Annales des empereurs du Japon.  Paris: Royal Asiatic Society, Oriental Translation Fund of Great Britain and Ireland.  
 Varley, H. Paul. (1980). Jinnō Shōtōki: A Chronicle of Gods and Sovereigns. New York: Columbia University Press. ;  

 
 

Japanese emperors
827 births
858 deaths
9th-century rulers in Asia
9th-century Japanese monarchs
People from Kyoto